The women's canoe sprint K-1 200 metres at the 2018 Mediterranean Games in Tarragona took place between 23 and 24 June at the Canal Olímpic de Catalunya.

Schedule
All times are Spain time (UTC+02:00)

Results

Heats

Heat 1

Heat 2

Semifinal

Final

 QF=Qualified for final, QS=Qualified for semifinal

References

External links
Heat 1 results
Heat 2 results
Semifinal results
Final results

Canoeing at the 2018 Mediterranean Games